Close (We Stroke the Flames) is the second single from German synthpop group Camouflage's fourth album Bodega Bohemia, released in 1993. The song was remixed for single release, adding a much more radio-friendly drum and synth track to the mostly-acoustic album version.

Lyrics
The text refers to the resurgent Neo-Nazism in Germany at that time with sentences like "They're marching on with torches....The tale is told again" and the warning 
"And if we don't care, we end up all the same. We stroke the flames, we never quenched all those years. We should have learned. from things which may come close."

Track listings
CD single (Germany, 1993) / 12" single (Germany, 1993)
 "Close (We Stroke the Flames)" (remix) – 3:59
 "Close (We Stroke the Flames)" (album version) – 4:12
 "Watch Out!" (instrumental) – 4:08

Track 1 remixed by Fischerman.

Credits
Design – Ingrid Albrecht 
Photography  – Reiner Pfisterer 
Producer – Dan Lacksman, Heiko Maile 
Written-By – H. Maile

References

1993 singles
Camouflage (band) songs
1993 songs
Metronome Records singles
Songs written by Heiko Maile